5.1 surround sound ("five-point one") is the common name for surround sound audio systems. 5.1 is the most commonly used layout in home theatres. It uses five full bandwidth channels and one low-frequency effects channel (the "point one"). Dolby Digital, Dolby Pro Logic II, DTS, SDDS, and THX are all common 5.1 systems. 5.1 is also the standard surround sound audio component of digital broadcast and music.

All 5.1 systems use the same speaker channels and configuration, having a front left and right, a center channel, two surround channels (left and right) and the low-frequency effects channel designed for a subwoofer.

History
A prototype for five-channel surround sound, then dubbed "quintaphonic sound", was used in the 1975 film Tommy.

5.1 dates back to 1976, when Dolby Labs modified the track usage of the six analogue magnetic soundtracks on Todd-AO 70 mm film prints. The Dolby application of optical matrix encoding in 1976 (released on the film Logan's Run) did not use split surrounds, and thus was not 5.1. Dolby first used split surrounds with 70 mm film, notably in 1979 with Apocalypse Now. Instead of the five screen channels and one surround channel of the Todd-AO format, Dolby Stereo 70 mm Six Track provided three screen channels, two high-passed surround channels and a low-frequency surround channel monophonically blended with the two surround channels.

When digital sound was applied to 35 mm release prints, with Batman Returns in 1992, the 5.1 layout was adopted. The ability to provide 5.1 sound had been one of the key reasons for using 70 mm for prestige screenings. The provision of 5.1 digital sound on 35 mm significantly reduced the use of the very expensive 70 mm format. Digital sound and the 5.1 format were introduced in 1990, by Kodak and Optical Radiation Corporation, with releases of Days of Thunder and The Doors using the CDS (Cinema Digital Sound) format.

5.1 digital surround, in the forms of Dolby Digital AC-3 and DTS, started appearing on several mid-1990s LaserDisc releases, among the earliest being Clear and Present Danger and Jurassic Park (the latter having both AC3 and DTS versions). Many DVD releases have Dolby Digital tracks up to 5.1 channels, due to the implementation of Dolby Digital in the development of the DVD format. In addition, some DVDs have DTS tracks, with most being 5.1 channel mixes (a few releases, however, have 6.1 “matrixed” or even discrete 6.1 tracks). Blu-ray and digital cinema both have eight-channel capability which can be used to provide either 5.1 or 7.1 surround sound. 7.1 is an extension of 5.1 that uses four surround zones: two at the sides and two at the back.

A system of digital 5.1 surround sound was also used in 1987 at the Parisian cabaret the Moulin Rouge, created by French engineer Dominique Bertrand. To achieve such a system in 1985, a dedicated mixing console had to be designed in cooperation with Solid State Logic, based on their 5000 series, and dedicated speakers in cooperation with APG. The console included ABCDEF channels: respectively, A left, B right, C centre, D left rear, E right rear, F bass.  The same engineer had already developed a similar 3.1 system in 1973, for use at the official International Summit of Francophone States in Dakar.

Application

Channel order
The order of channels in a 5.1 file is different across file formats. The order in WAV files is (not complete) Front Left, Front Right, Center, Low-frequency effects, Surround Left, Surround Right.

Music 

In music, the main goal of 5.1 surround sound is a proper localization and equability of all acoustic sources for a center-positioned audience. Therefore, ideally five matched speakers should be used.

For playback of 5.1 music, the International Telecommunication Union (ITU) recommends the following configuration (ITU-R BS 775):
 five speakers of the same size for front, center and surround
 identical distance from the listeners for all five speakers
 angle adjustment regarding viewing direction of audience: center 0°, front ±22.5° for movies ±30° for music, surround ±110°

See also 
Ambisonics
Timeline of audio formats
Stereophonic sound

References 

Consumer electronics
Entertainment
Film
Surround sound
High-definition television
Ultra-high-definition television